Boxing was one of the sports held at the 2009 Mediterranean Games.

Medalists

Medal table

References
2009 Mediterranean Games report at the International Committee of Mediterranean Games (CIJM) website
2009 Mediterranean Games boxing tournament at Amateur Boxing Results

Medi
Sports at the 2009 Mediterranean Games
2009